Commons is a Chilean left-wing political party, founded in 2019 by the merger between the Citizen Power party and the Autonomous Left (Izquierda Autónoma) movement.

The party has two deputies in the National Congress. Among its notable militants are Emilia Schneider, the first transgender president of the University of Chile Student Federation (FECH).

Authorities

Deputies

Presidential candidates 
The following is a list of the presidential candidates supported by Commoners. (Information gathered from the Archive of Chilean Elections).

2021: Gabriel Boric (won)

Electoral history

Congress election

References

External links
 Official site

2019 establishments in Chile
Autonomism
Left-wing politics in Chile
Political parties established in 2019
Socialist parties in Chile